The East and West Blockhouses were Device Forts built by King Henry VIII in 1539 to protect the harbour of Milford Haven in Wales. The two blockhouses were positioned on either side of the Milford Haven Waterway in the villages of Angle and Dale respectively, overlooking the sea. The East Blockhouse was never completed, but the remains were reused as a defensive site in the Second World War. The West Blockhouse was described by contemporaries as forming a round tower with gunports, but it was demolished when West Blockhouse Fort was built on the same site in the 19th century.

Background
The two blockhouses were built as a consequence of international tensions between England, France and the Holy Roman Empire in the final years of the reign of King Henry VIII. Traditionally the Crown had left coastal defences to the local lords and communities, only taking a modest role in building and maintaining fortifications, and with France and the Empire in conflict with one another, maritime raids were common but an actual invasion of England seemed unlikely. Modest defences, based around simple blockhouses and towers, existed in the south-west and along the Sussex coast, with a few more impressive works in the north of England, but in general the fortifications were very limited in scale.

In 1533, Henry broke with Pope Paul III to annul the long-standing marriage to his wife, Catherine of Aragon, and remarry. Catherine was the aunt of Charles V, the Holy Roman Emperor, and he took the annulment as a personal insult. This resulted in France and the Empire declaring an alliance against Henry in 1538, and the Pope encouraging the two countries to attack England. An invasion of England now appeared certain.

Construction
Henry issued an order, called a "device", in 1539, giving instructions for the "defence of the realm in time of invasion" and the construction of forts along the English coastline. Soon afterwards work began on the East Blockhouse in the village of Angle. Angle overlooked the mouth of Milford Haven harbour in Pembrokeshire; another fortification, the West Blockhouse, was built just across the other side of the Milford Haven Waterway at Dale.

The construction work was never completed and by 1546 the walls had begun to collapse. According to Owen, the West Blockhouse was a round tower,  in diameter, with eight gunports.

Later use

After peace was achieved with France in 1558, military attention shifted towards the Spanish threat to the increasingly prosperous south-west side of England. Tensions with Spain grew and invasion appeared likely in 1589, resulting in royal permission being given to reuse the stonework from the East Blockhouse for new coastal defences, but this work was not carried out. The fort continued to decay until the 20th century. With the outbreak of the Second World War in 1939, the East Blockhouse was adapted for use by the British military. The interior was cleared out and a shed was built in one corner. A slit trench was dug on the north side of the building, a rifle embrasure formed on the east side of the building, and a machine-gun position was dug out and protected with sandbags outside it.

Land erosion has damaged the East Blockhouse site; the north wall collapsed before 1975, and between 2010 and 2011 there was another major landslip. An archaeological survey of the blockhouse, funded by the Welsh heritage agency Cadw, took place in 2011. The East Blockhouse is the only such defensive structure to survive in Wales and is protected under UK law as a scheduled monument.

The West Blockhouse was demolished in the 19th century, when West Blockhouse Fort was built on the same site, and there are no visible remains.

See also
Castles in Great Britain and Ireland
List of castles in England

References

Bibliography
 
 
 
 
 
 
 
 
 
 

Device Forts
Buildings and structures in Milford Haven
Forts in Pembrokeshire
History of Pembrokeshire
Ruins in Wales
Archaeological sites in Pembrokeshire
Blockhouses